Gulgastrura is a genus of springtails in the family Gulgastruridae. It is the sole genus of the family Gulgastruridae, and Gulgastrura reticulosa is its only species. It was discovered in 1966, in a limestone cave in Korea.

References

Further reading

 
 

Poduromorpha